Lapthorne is a surname. Notable people with the surname include:

Andrew Lapthorne (born 1990), British wheelchair tennis player
Darren Lapthorne (born 1983), Australian professional racing cyclist
Len Lapthorne (1919-1997), Australian footballer
Richard Lapthorne (born 1943), English company director

See also
Lapthorn

English-language surnames